Charuymaq County is in East Azerbaijan province, Iran. The capital of the county is the city of Qarah Aghaj. At the 2006 census, the county's population was 33,921 in 6,396 households. The following census in 2011 counted 32,745 people in 8,202 households. At the 2016 census, the county's population was 31,071 in 9,016 households.

Etymology 
According to Vladimir Minorsky, the name Chār-oymāq means "the four tribes" (from the Mongolian word aymaq, meaning "tribe"). Until the mid-20th century, the Charuymaq district was known as Oryād or Uryād, after the Oirats, a Mongol tribe. According to the Ālam-ārā, a tribe known as Uryād historically lived among (but was separate from) the Mukri Kurds.

Administrative divisions

The population history of Charuymaq County's administrative divisions over three consecutive censuses is shown in the following table. The latest census shows two districts, six rural districts, and one city.

References

 

Counties of East Azerbaijan Province